Lytocestidae is a family of flatworms belonging to the order Caryophyllidea.

Genera:
 Atractolytocestus Anthony, 1958
 Bovienia Fuhrmann, 1931
 Caryoaustralus Mackiewicz & Blair, 1980

References

Platyhelminthes